Vladislav Rubin (born 22 March 1999) is a Belarusian professional footballer who plays for Kolos Cherven.

References

External links 
 
 

1999 births
Living people
Belarusian footballers
Association football midfielders
FC Neman Stolbtsy players
FC Torpedo Minsk players
FC Uzda players